The Drama Desk Award for Outstanding Projection Design is an annual award presented by The Drama Desk Organization in recognition of achievements in the theatre among Broadway, Off Broadway and Off-Off Broadway productions.

Winners and nominees

2000s

2010s

2020s

References

External links
 Drama Desk official website

Projection Design
Awards for projection designers